Nicholas James Kroll  (born 23 June 1954) is a civil servant who served as director of the BBC Trust from 2007 to 2014. He was the principal adviser to the BBC Trust and head of the BBC Trust Unit, the BBC department that supports and advises the trust.

Education
Kroll was educated at St Paul's School, London and the University of Oxford where he was an undergrduate student at Corpus Christi College, Oxford.

Career
Kroll was originally appointed director of governance at the BBC in October 2004. His appointment followed a shake up of the governance arrangements at the BBC implemented by the then BBC chairman, Michael Grade. Kroll was appointed to lead the Governance Unit, a small team of staff reporting to and supporting the Board of Governors of the BBC.

Upon the formation of the BBC Trust as the governing body of the Corporation, Kroll was appointed Director. He is the head of the Trust Unit, a group of nearly 70 BBC staff that report directly to the BBC Trust, outside of the BBC management chain. In 2010/11 the cost of the Trust Unit was £10.8 million.

Prior to working at the BBC, Kroll was a career civil servant; he joined the civil service in 1977.

From 2002 to 2004 he was chief operating officer and deputy to the permanent secretary at the Department for Culture, Media and Sport, responsible for developing and delivering the department's change management programme and setting new strategic priorities within the DCMS. Previous posts at the DCMS include corporate services director (2000 to 2002) and a period as acting permanent secretary during 2001. He was also director of Creative Industries, Media and Broadcasting Group (1996 to 2000), head of Broadcasting Policy Division (1995 to 1996), and head of the Arts Division (1993 to 1995).

Kroll also worked at HM Treasury, where he was head of the European Community Budget Division (1990 to 1993) and the head of Banking Policy Branch (1986 to 1990). Previously, he worked at the Department of Transport (1982 to 1986) and the Department of Environment and Transport (1977 to 1982).

Awards and honours
Kroll was appointed Companion of the Order of the Bath (CB) in the 2002 New Year Honours.

Personal life
Kroll is married and has two children. His brother  is a Professor of Paediatrics and Molecular Infectious Diseases at Imperial College London.

References

1954 births
Alumni of Corpus Christi College, Oxford
BBC people
People educated at St Paul's School, London
Companions of the Order of the Bath
Living people